Kurt Behrens (November 26, 1884 – February 5, 1928) was a German diver who competed in the 1908 Summer Olympics and in the 1912 Summer Olympics.

In 1908 he won the silver medal in the 3 metre springboard event. Four years later he won the bronze medal in the 3 metre springboard event. In the plain high diving as well as in the 10 metre platform competition he was eliminated in the first round.

References

External links
profile

1884 births
1928 deaths
German male divers
Divers at the 1908 Summer Olympics
Divers at the 1912 Summer Olympics
Olympic divers of Germany
Olympic silver medalists for Germany
Olympic bronze medalists for Germany
Olympic medalists in diving
Medalists at the 1912 Summer Olympics
Medalists at the 1908 Summer Olympics
20th-century German people